The 2022–23 Thai League Cup is the 13th season in the second era of a Thailand's knockout football competition. All games are played as a single match. It was sponsored by Toyota Motor Thailand, and known as the Hilux Revo Cup for sponsorship purposes, Hilux Revo is a truck model of Toyota. 86 clubs were accepted into the tournament, and it began with the first qualification round on 3 September 2022 and concluded with the final on TBD. The tournament has been readmitted back into Thai football after a 10-year absence. The prize money for this prestigious award is said to be around 5 million baht and the runners-up will be netting 1 million baht.

This is the first edition of the competition and the qualifying round will be played in regions featuring clubs from the Thai League 3.

Calendar

Results
Note: T1: Clubs from Thai League 1; T2: Clubs from Thai League 2; T3: Clubs from Thai League 3.

First qualification round
34 clubs from 2022–23 Thai League 3 have signed to first qualify in the 2022–23 Thai League cup. This round had drawn on 19 August 2022. 53 goals occurred in this round.

Northern region
 The qualifying round would be played in the northern region featuring 4 clubs from the 2022–23 Thai League 3 Northern Region.

Northeastern region
 The qualifying round would be played in the northeastern region featuring 8 clubs from the 2022–23 Thai League 3 Northeastern Region.

Eastern region
 The qualifying round would be played in the eastern region featuring 2 clubs from the 2022–23 Thai League 3 Eastern Region.

Western region
 The qualifying round would be played in the western region featuring 4 clubs from the 2022–23 Thai League 3 Western Region.

Southern region
 The qualifying round would be played in the southern region featuring 8 clubs from the 2022–23 Thai League 3 Southern Region.

Bangkok metropolitan region
 The qualifying round would be played in the Bangkok metropolitan region featuring 8 clubs from the 2022–23 Thai League 3 Bangkok Metropolitan Region.

Second qualification round
The second qualifying round would be featured 17 clubs that were the winners of the first qualification round and the new entries that were 23 clubs from the 2022–23 Thai League 3. 69 goals occurred in this round.

Northern region
 The qualifying round would be played in the northern region featuring 6 clubs from the 2022–23 Thai League 3 Northern Region.

Northeastern region
 The qualifying round would be played in the northeastern region featuring 6 clubs from the 2022–23 Thai League 3 Northeastern Region.

Eastern region
 The qualifying round would be played in the eastern region featuring 10 clubs from the 2022–23 Thai League 3 Eastern Region.

Western region
 The qualifying round would be played in the western region featuring 6 clubs from the 2022–23 Thai League 3 Western Region.

Southern region
 The qualifying round would be played in the southern region featuring 6 clubs from the 2022–23 Thai League 3 Southern Region.

Bangkok metropolitan region
 The qualifying round would be played in the Bangkok metropolitan region featuring 6 clubs from the 2022–23 Thai League 3 Bangkok Metropolitan Region.

Qualification play-off round
The qualification play-off round would be featured 20 clubs that were the winners of the second qualification round and the new entries that were 14 clubs from the 2022–23 Thai League 2. This round had drawn on 28 September 2022. 60 goals occurred in this round.

First round
The first round would be featured 17 clubs that were the winners of the qualification play-off round including 9 clubs from T2 and 8 clubs from T3 and the new entries that were 15 clubs from the 2022–23 Thai League 1. This round had drawn on 26 October 2022. 37 goals occurred in this round.

Second round
The second round would be featured 16 clubs that were the winners of the first round including 10 clubs from T1, 3 clubs from T2, and 3 clubs from T3. This round had drawn on 8 December 2022. 22 goals occurred in this round.

Quarter-finals
The quarter-finals would be featured 8 clubs that were the winners of the second round including 6 clubs from T1, 1 club from T2, and 1 club from T3. This round had drawn on 1 February 2023. 11 goals occurred in this round.

Semi-finals
The semi-finals would be featured 4 clubs that were the winners of the quarter-finals, all are clubs from T1.

Tournament statistics

Top goalscorers

Hat-tricks

Notes: (H) = Home team; (A) = Away team

See also
 2022–23 Thai League 1
 2022–23 Thai League 2
 2022–23 Thai League 3
 2022–23 Thai League 3 Northern Region
 2022–23 Thai League 3 Northeastern Region
 2022–23 Thai League 3 Eastern Region
 2022–23 Thai League 3 Western Region
 2022–23 Thai League 3 Southern Region
 2022–23 Thai League 3 Bangkok Metropolitan Region
 2022–23 Thai League 3 National Championship
 2022–23 Thai FA Cup
 2022 Thailand Champions Cup

References

External links
 Thai League official website

2022 in Thai football cups
Thailand League Cup
Thai League Cup
Thai League Cup seasons
2022–23 Asian domestic association football cups